Hall Street Historic District is a national historic district located at St. Joseph, Missouri. The district encompasses 43 contributing buildings in a predominantly residential section of St. Joseph. It developed between about 1870 and 1920, and includes representative examples of Italianate and Late Victorian style architecture. Notable buildings include the Karl Schatz House (c. 1880), Rolanda Court Apartments (c. 1910), Chase-McClain House (1870s), John Forest Martie House (c. 1870), Oak Ridge Apartments (1890), James H. Robinson - William W. Wheeler House (1883), Cummings Ogden House (1885), Bill Osgood House (1890), and Missouri Methodist Hospital - Huggins House (1908).

It was listed on the National Register of Historic Places in 1979.

References

Historic districts on the National Register of Historic Places in Missouri
Italianate architecture in Missouri
Victorian architecture in Missouri
Historic districts in St. Joseph, Missouri
National Register of Historic Places in Buchanan County, Missouri